JWN may refer to:
 Nordstrom (NYSE: JWN), an American fashion retailer
 John C. Tune Airport (FAA: JWN), in Nashville, Tennessee, United States
 Zanjan Airport (IATA: JWN), in Iran